Inno Setup is a free software script-driven installation system created in Delphi by Jordan Russell. The first version was released in 1997.

History 
Since Jordan Russell wasn't satisfied with InstallShield Express which he had received upon purchase of Borland Delphi, he decided to make his own installer. The first public version was 1.09.

To make an installation package with version 1.09, an "ISS.TXT" file needed to be created in the installation directory. In the file, the user needed to supply variables and values which are still used in Inno Setup today. These variables served as the configuration of the installation package but many other features could not be changed. The installation compiler had no editor and was more of a shell to compile scripts.

Inno Setup grew popular due to being free and open source; free for both commercial and non-commercial use, many software companies switched to the tool. Since Inno Setup was based around scripting, fans of Inno Setup started ISTool and ScriptMaker to aid in visual and simpler ways to make installations for Inno Setup.

Inno Setup has won many awards including the Shareware Industry Awards three times in a row — from 2002 to 2004.

Many people have taken Inno Setup source code and used it to develop third-party versions of Inno Setup. An example is My Inno Setup Extensions by Martijn Laan, which was incorporated into Inno Setup in June 2003.

Features

Key features
 Supports Windows Vista and later. Earlier versions supported Windows 2000, Windows XP and Windows Server 2003 (OS requirements change), Windows 9x and Windows NT 4.0 (before 5.5.0), Windows NT 3.51 (before v3.0.0) and Windows 3.X (Before v1.3.0).
 Support for multiple platforms (IA-32, x64 and IA-64) in a single binary. ARM64 is also supported.
 Supports creation of a single EXE to install programs for easy online distribution (MSI support requires third-party products)
 Supports disk spanning
 Customizable setup types, for example, "full", "minimal", and "custom"
 Complete uninstall capabilities
 Integrated support for DEFLATE, bzip2, and LZMA file compression
 Support for comparing file version information, replacing in-use files, shared file counting, registering DLL/OCXs and type libraries, and installing fonts
 Creation of shortcuts, including in the Start Menu and on the desktop
 Creation of registry and INI file entries
 Integrated scripting engine based on Pascal Script
 Support for multilingual installs
 Support for passworded and encrypted installs
 Silent install and uninstall
 Supports Unicode and right-to-left languages

See also 

List of installation software

References

External links

The Inno Setup Extensions Knowledge Base (offline, link to archived page)
Inno Setup Review by Dave Murray - An extensive review of Inno Setup (offline, link to archived page)
Lexpa ISVS - Inno Setup add-in for Visual Studio (offline, link to archived page)
Inno Setup reporting via Google Analytics - How can developers can see installation statistics of Inno Setup via Google Analytics.

Free installation software
Free software programmed in Delphi
Windows-only free software
Software that uses Scintilla
Software using the BSD license
Pascal (programming language) software